Deep Water Slang V2.0 is a studio album by Zion I. It was released by Raptivism Records in 2003. It peaked at number 49 on the Billboard Independent Albums chart.

Critical reception

Scott Thill of AllMusic gave the album 2 out of 5 stars, writing, "This Berkeley-based (big ups, Cal Bears!) underground hip-hop duo's sophomore effort is chock-full of their usual lyrical hooks and flows, but as with much product released by those looking to make their way in the bling-bling marketplace, it suffers somewhat in the production department." Thomas Quinlan of Exclaim! wrote, "Even now, when people are becoming more open to experimentation in hip-hop, it's rare to see such a diverse album still easily identified as hip-hop." Nathan Rabin of The A.V. Club praised "a heightened sense of political consciousness."

Track listing

Personnel
Credits adapted from liner notes.

 Zion (Zion I) – vocals, berimbau (12), flute (15)
 418 Hz Productionz (Zion I) – production
 DJ Fuze – turntables (1)
 Queen Jahneen – vocals (1)
 Tef the Traktitioner – co-production (2), keyboards (2)
 DJ J-Period – turntables (2, 5)
 Pep Love – vocals (3)
 Jog9 – vocals (3, 9)
 Susie Suh – vocals (4, 5)
 Dust – vocals (4, 12)
 B'nai Rebelsfront – guitar (4)
 Errol Cooney – guitar (4)
 Vernon Hall – bass guitar (4)
 Josh Jones – drums (4)
 Deuce Eclipse – vocals (5, 12)
 The Grouch – vocals (6)
 Goapele – vocals (6, 11, 13)
 Ajai Jackson – piano (6), electric piano (6), string arrangement (11)
 Steve Hogan – upright bass (6)
 Max MacVeety – drums (6)
 Vin Roc – turntables (6, 9, 14)
 Mike Tiger – synthesizer (7), guitar (14)
 Paris King – guitar (8)
 Aceyalone – vocals (9)
 Martin Luther – vocals (9)
 Killa Kela – human beatbox (10)
 DJ D-Sharp – turntables (10)
 Robert Thompson – violin (10)
 Quincy Griffin – flute (11)
 Betsy London – viola (11)
 Jeff Watson – cello (11)
 Willie Maze – turntables (12)
 Blak Lion – guitar (13)
 Jason Moss – mixing
 Justin Weis – mastering
 Theo Rodrigues – art direction, layout
 Martin Aranuado – art direction, layout
 Victor J. Brunetti – additional layout
 Robin Twomey – photography

Charts

References

External links
 

2003 albums
Zion I albums